Rodrigo Noya (born 1993) is a former child actor from Argentina. He is best known for his starring role as Lorenzo Montero in an action series, Hermanos & Detectives. Father : Eduardo Noya. Mother : Marta Noya. Sister : Agustina Noya

Biography
Noya made his film debut in Raúl Rodríguez Peila's Dibu 3. His additional film credits includes Alejandro Agresti's Todo el bien del mundo and notably Valentín, a film that gained international success.

Filmography (selected)

El hotel de los famosos (2022)
Bailando 2019 (2019)
El mural (2010)
Hermanos y detectives (serie de televisión de España) (2007-2009)
Hermanos y detectives (serie de televisión de Argentina) (TV Series) (2006)
Un mundo menos peor (2004)
El sueño de Valentín (Valentín) (2002)
Dibu 3 (2002)
Agrandadytos (1998)

External links

Rodrigo Noya at cinenacional.com

Argentine male film actors
Argentine male child actors
Argentine male television actors
Living people
1993 births
Participants in Argentine reality television series
Bailando por un Sueño (Argentine TV series) participants